Gonzalo Menéndez-Pidal was a Spanish historian, cartographer, cinematographer, photographer, and archivist. He was the youngest historian ever to be admitted to the Spanish Royal Academy of History, was the son of Ramon Menendez Pidal and the outstanding Maria Goyri de Menendez Pidal, who was the first woman to officially graduate from a Spanish University, the Universidad de Madrid.

Gonzalo Menendez-Pidal, typical younger child of a notable family, knew how to combine the family fascination for the history of the Iberian Peninsula with an interest in the latest technologies. Whereas his father and mother traveled about Spain making wax recordings of traditional songs and ballads, Gonzalo Menendez-Pidal studied cinematography at the Film und Bildamt der Stadt Berlin. He filmed his experiences as he traveled about Spain in the time leading up to the Spanish Civil War. Most were anthropological documentaries; one set chronicles the student theater group, “La Barraca”, which was he created with Federico García Lorca among others.

Gonzalo Menendez-Pidal excelled in photography. He not only recorded and catalogued bits of Spanish tools and hardware; he learned to make the tool, and the why of the tool, and learned to use the tool. His home in the mountains outside of Madrid was not only a photographic archive of the history of Spain, it was a workshop that showed how Spain was built.

This man, every bit as great as his father, mother and family, went about cementing its reputation as upholder of its unique character one image at a time. His archives are a tribute to the ingenuity of the Spaniards.  His unabashed enthusiasm and scientific approach are well married in his many books about Spain.

References 

 En Recuerdo de Gonzalo Menendez-Pidal. Residencia de Estudiantes, Madrid, Spain. 2008

External links 
 https://www.imdb.com/name/nm0580051/
 https://www.poets.org/viewmedia.php/prmMID/22394
 http://www.elpais.com/articulo/Necrologicas/Gonzalo/Menendez/Pidal/historiador/analitico/elpepinec/20081214elpepinec_2/Tes
 http://dialnet.unirioja.es/servlet/articulo?codigo=3072414
 http://www.lne.es/secciones/noticia.jsp?pRef=2008121500_42_706973__Asturias-Fallece-Madrid-Gonzalo-Menendez-Pidal-historiador-fotografo-hombre-cine
 http://www.almendron.com/tribuna/23204/gonzalo-menendez-pidal-y-goyri-in-memoriam/

Spanish archivists
Spanish cartographers
Spanish cinematographers
20th-century Spanish historians
Spanish photographers